Tritoma is a genus of beetles in the family Erotylidae, the pleasing fungus beetles. It is distributed worldwide, mainly in the Old World. There are over 100 species.

Some species consume euagaric mushrooms, staying concealed amidst the gills as they feed. Some feed on mushrooms growing from dead trees, as well as mycorrhizae on living roots. One of the most common pleasing fungus beetles in Europe, T. bipustulata, is a black beetle with red spots which engages in autohaemorrhaging as a defensive behavior.

Molecular analysis suggests that Tritoma is paraphyletic, and might be best treated as two separate genera.

Selected species

 Tritoma angulata Say, 1826 i c g b
 Tritoma atriventris LeConte, 1847 i c g b
 Tritoma aulica (Horn, 1871) i c g
 Tritoma biguttata (Say, 1825) i c g b
 Tritoma bipustulata Fabricius, 1775 g
 Tritoma erythrocephala Lacordaire, 1842 i c g b
 Tritoma fasciata Chujo, 1941 g
 Tritoma gressitti (Chujo, 1968) g
 Tritoma humeralis Fabricius, 1801 i c g b
 Tritoma kanekoi Araki, 1943 g
 Tritoma metasobrina Chujo, 1941 g
 Tritoma mimetica (Crotch, 1873) i c g b
 Tritoma pulchra Say, 1826 i c g b (handsome tritoma)
 Tritoma sanguinipennis (Say, 1825) i c g b (red-winged tritoma)
 Tritoma shirakii Chujo, 1936 g
 Tritoma subbasalis (Reitter, 1896) g
 Tritoma sungkangensis Nakane, 1966 g
 Tritoma taiwana Chujo, 1936 g
 Tritoma takasagona Chujo, 1941 g
 Tritoma tenebrosa Fall, 1912 i c g b (darkling tritoma)
 Tritoma unicolor Say, 1826 i c g b
 Tritoma yamazii Chujo, 1941 g
 Tritoma yiei Nakane, 1966 g

Data sources: i = ITIS, c = Catalogue of Life, g = GBIF, b = Bugguide.net

References

External links
 
 

Erotylidae
Cucujoidea genera